Doney or Doney's was a cafeteria in Florence established at the end of the 19th century. The Doney was favoured by aristocracy and upper middle-class, particularly by British citizens living in Florence, such as The Scorpioni.

When Benito Mussolini attacked Abyssinia (now Ethiopia), the British expressed their public disapproval. This led to some outbreaks of Fascist violence at the  Doney in 1935–36.

The most famous customers of  Doney were socialite Violet Trefusis who was an acquaintance of Mussolini himself, and a group of elderly English ladies called The Scorpioni who resided in Florence between the World Wars.

The cafeteria closed down in 1986.

 Doney is also one of the main settings in Franco Zeffirelli's autobiographical film Tea with Mussolini.

See also 
 The Scorpioni
 Tea with Mussolini

History of Florence
Buildings and structures in Florence
Coffeehouses and cafés in Italy
Restaurants disestablished in 1986
1986 disestablishments in Italy
Defunct restaurants in Italy